Woodchurch is an area of Birkenhead on the Wirral Peninsula, in England.  Administratively, Woodchurch is within the Metropolitan Borough of Wirral, its parliamentary constituency is Wirral West, and its local council ward is Upton. At the 2001 Census, it had a population of 8,400 (3,840 males, 4,560 females). 
Woodchurch is dominated by a large housing development, known as the Woodchurch Estate.

History

Woodchurch was originally a farming area and ancient village of the Wirral Hundred, known mainly for its parish church and the neighbouring Arrowe Park country estate. The first recorded owner of the land was an Anglo-Saxon chief called Aescwulf who claimed ownership of Woodchurch, Arrowe and Landican. Although not recorded in the Domesday Book, Woodchurch was recorded as Wude Church in 1093.

The population was 52 in 1801, 96 in 1851 and 140 in 1901.

20th century
The area was purchased by Birkenhead Corporation in 1926, becoming part of Birkenhead civil parish. Construction of a new housing estate complete with shops, schools, industry and leisure facilities began immediately after World War II. Of the old village, only the church and its adjoining school remain.

From 1968, the Champion Spark Plug Company operated an automotive components factory on Arrowe Brook Road, employing at one time over 1,000 people. It was closed in 2006 with production transferred to Italy.

From the 1950s to the 1980s, the CO-OP operated a clothing factory and industrial laundry on Woodchurch Road and its water-tower and chimney were local landmarks. This business had become a Leo's superstore by 1986, and is currently a branch of Asda.

Geography

The River Fender bounds Woodchurch to the east. The Fender joins the Birket, before discharging into West Float and then into the River Mersey.

Community

The housing estate was planned in 1944 by Sir Charles Reilly, although this scheme was replaced by that of his student, H. J. Rowse. Building commenced in 1946, with the first house being officially opened on 6 May 1949.

The housing estate itself is populated by mainly low income residents, with well above average levels of unemployment. During the late 1960s and 1970s, youths from Woodchurch were periodically involved in gang violence with youths from neighbouring estates. In the early 1980s, during a period of exceptionally high national unemployment, the area gained a reputation for drug and social problems (as did some neighbouring estates like those of Noctorum and Ford). In the late 1980s the estate was given a facelift, along with some of its neighbours. Today its social problems are largely a thing of the past, although unemployment levels are still above the UK national average.

Religion

Holy Cross Church is the Church of England church, dating from the 12th century. The distinctive Roman Catholic St. Michael and All Angels church was designed by the F. X. Velarde Partnership. This church was commissioned in 1962 and opened in 1965, to serve the parish which had been founded in 1952. Woodchurch Methodist Chapel was built in 1963.

Education
Despite the low income catchment area, the local comprehensive, Woodchurch High School, has consistently attained a strong ranking in the Government's national league tables for secondary education. Noctorum Girls School (later known as St. Benedict's) was situated on the edge of the estate, on the Woodchurch side of the M53 motorway. The school later closing in the early 2000s and, after being demolished in 2009, the site is now being redeveloped for new housing.

Leisure

Public houses
Woodchurch has two public houses, these being The Woodchurch and the Arrowe Park Hotel. The Pelican was closed and demolished in the early 2000s. The Stirrup closed in November 2018.

Parks and commons
Woodchurch is situated adjacent to Arrowe Park. The housing estate is separated from the M53 motorway by a large piece of common land.

Sport

Woodchurch Leisure Centre has an indoor  heated swimming pool, an aerobics studio, an adjacent social hub and a caged floodlit sports area with football pitches. The leisure centre hosts the Wirral Judo Club, as well as karate and archery clubs.

Transport

Road
The A551 runs along the western side of Woodchurch, and the A552 along the southern side. The A552 and the M53 motorway cross with a three-level stacked roundabout at Junction 3 of the motorway, which is at the south-eastern corner of the housing estate. The M53 runs on an approximate north-south axis along the eastern side of the housing estate. The A5027 Upton bypass runs along the northern side of Woodchurch.

Buses
Services are run primarily by Stagecoach, and are coordinated by Merseytravel.

Rail
Upton railway station is the nearest station to Woodchurch, where Transport for Wales diesel services operate between Bidston and Wrexham on the Borderlands Line. Woodchurch railway station is proposed for this line.

Cycling
National Cycle Route 56 passes along the eastern side of the housing estate, along Ackers Road, Home Farm Road, New Hey Road and Carr Bridge Road, then on a paved path towards Upton railway station. This route goes from Chester to Liverpool, via Leasowe and Seacombe, and includes part of the Wirral Way along its course.

Notable people
 Richard Adams, religious writer, raised in Woodchurch.
 Thomas Adams, religious writer, raised in Woodchurch.
 Richard Sherlock, clergyman, baptised at Woodchurch.
 Bryan Robin, English Anglican priest, incumbent in Woodchurch.

See also
Listed buildings in Woodchurch, Merseyside

References

Sources

Further reading

External links

Towns and villages in the Metropolitan Borough of Wirral
Birkenhead